Yevsikov (masculine) or Yevsikova (feminine) is a Russian last name, a variant of Yevsyukov.

The following people share this last name:
Anton Evsikov (Yevsikov), Russian swimmer participating in the open water swimming at the 2014 European Aquatics Championships – Men's 5 km
Denis Yevsikov (b. 1981), Russian association football player
Sergey Yevsikov, housemate on the Russian reality TV show Big Brother
Tatyana Yevsikova, mayor of Anapa, a town in Krasnodar Krai, Russia

See also
Yevsikovo, a rural locality (a village) in Pizhansky District of Kirov Oblast, Russia;

References

Notes

Sources
И. М. Ганжина (I. M. Ganzhina). "Словарь современных русских фамилий" (Dictionary of Modern Russian Last Names). Москва, 2001. 

Russian-language surnames
